Adactylotis is a genus of moths in the family Geometridae.

Species
 Adactylotis contaminaria (Hübner, 1813)
 Adactylotis gesticularia (Hübner, 1817)

References
 Adactylotis at Markku Savela's Lepidoptera and some other life forms

Boarmiini
Geometridae genera